Olympe de G. is a feminist  French director. She creates numerous sexually explicit short films for the productions of Erika Lust.  After this she devotes to the creation of erotic and educational audio content such as the podcast Voxxx.

Filmography

As a Director 

 The Bitchhiker (short film, 2016, created by Erika Lust)
 Don’t Call Me a Dick (short film, 2017, created by Erika Lust)
 Take Me Through the Looking Glass (short film, 2017, created by Erika Lust)
 We are the Fucking World (short film, 2017, created by Erika Lust)
 One last time (long film, 2020, co-produced by Kidam, Olympe de G. Production, Topshot Films et Canal+)

As an Actress 

 A beautiful Sunday (Un beau dimanche) (short film by Lucie Blush, 2016)
 The Bitchhiker (short film d’Olympe de G., 2016, produced Erika Lust)
 Architecture Porn (short film by Erika Lust, 2017)

Audiography 

 The pink app (erotic audio fiction series, 2018, produced by Audible)
 Room 206 (Chambre 206) (immersive audio work, 2018, produced by Audible)
 The sound of sex (Le Son du sexe) (audio documentary, 2018, for Rinse FM)
 Voxxx (independent podcast, 2018 and 2019)
 Coxxx (independent podcast)
 Boxxx (independent podcast)

Awards 
Olympe de G. has won several awards, including Most Tantalizing Trans Short for We Are the (Fucking) World at the Toronto International Porn Film Festival, the Insomnia Award for Don't Call Me a Dick at La Guarimba Film Festival, Best Experimental short for Don't Call Me a Dick at Cine Kink.

Notes and references 

French film directors
French podcasters
French pornographic film directors
French women film directors
Living people
Year of birth missing (living people)